The Immaculate Conception Seminary School of Theology (ICSST) is the major seminary for the Roman Catholic Archdiocese of Newark and is part of Seton Hall University, a Roman Catholic university located in South Orange, New Jersey.

History
 ICSST is one of the oldest Catholic seminaries in the United States. Seton Hall is the oldest diocesan university in the country. ICSST admits lay persons, as well as seminarians, as students. In addition to a Seminary Formation Program to prepare men for priesthood, ICSST has a renowned graduate program offering the following degrees:

Master of Arts in Theology (MA)
Master of Arts in Pastoral Ministry (MAPM)
Master of Divinity (M.Div.)

The school attracts students from all over the world and in 2006 created a bachelor's degree program in Catholic Theology.

Notable alumni
 Michael Angelo Saltarelli, former Bishop of Wilmington
 Peter Baldacchino, an Auxiliary Bishop of Miami
 John P. Washington, one of the Four Chaplains, who died in World War II

References

External links
 ICSST official website
 Seton Hall University official website

Seton Hall University
Catholic seminaries in the United States
Seminaries and theological colleges in New Jersey
Educational institutions established in 1861
1861 establishments in New Jersey